Bottineau is a city in Bottineau County, North Dakota, United States. The city's population was 2,194 at the 2020 census.

The city is home to Dakota College at Bottineau. Attractions in Bottineau include the Bottineau Winter Park and "Tommy Turtle," the world's largest turtle, which has become a landmark for the city. The International Peace Garden is nearby to the northeast.

Bottineau is also home to Programmer's Broadcasting, which owns and operates KBTO, along with KTZU and KWGO in Minot.

History

Bottineau was founded in 1883 as Oak Creek as a customs station and an overnight stagecoach stop. The town name was changed to Bottineau in 1884 in honor of Pierre Bottineau  a Métis pioneer, hunter, and trapper, who became a successful land speculator.

The town was originally located about 1½ miles (2½ km) north of its current location. The entire town was moved south in 1887 to where the Great Northern Railway was installing new tracks.

The facility will be North Dakota's first ski facility for handicapped children and wounded veterans. It is being built to honor Ann Nicole Nelson, who was the only North Dakotan to die in the September 11 attacks on the World Trade Center in New York City.

Geography and climate

Bottineau has a humid continental climate (Koppen: Dfb) with four seasons and huge differences in temperatures throughout the year. Summers tend to be warm, sometimes hot, and winters are severely cold.

Law and government
Bottineau uses the city council style of municipal government. Citizens are divided by location into four wards, who each elect two city council members, for a total of eight.

The current president of the city council is Doug Marsden and the current mayor of the city is Perry Schoenborn. The city council meets on the first Monday of every month in the city's Armory.

Economy

The economy in Bottineau is based on agriculture and recreational activities.

The city's commercial district consists mainly of small local shops, but a Wal-Mart Supercenter store is now operating within Bottineau; some consider this unusual for a town of such a small size. Bottineau is also home to the Bottineau County Fair, which is the state's oldest county fair.

Demographics

2010 census
As of the census of 2010, there were 2,211 people, 972 households, and 538 families living in the city. The racial makeup of the city was 92.4% White, 0.7% African American, 4.1% Native American, 0.5% Asian, 0.2% from other races, and 2.2% from two or more races. Hispanic or Latino of any race were 1.4% of the population.

There were 972 households, of which 23.3% had children under the age of 18 living with them, 43.5% were married couples living together, 8.8% had a female householder with no husband present, 3.0% had a male householder with no wife present, and 44.7% were non-families. 41.0% of all households were made up of individuals, and 21.7% had someone living alone who was 65 years of age or older. The average household size was 2.02 and the average family size was 2.71.

The median age in the city was 44.9 years. 18.1% of residents were under the age of 18; 13.5% were between the ages of 18 and 24; 18.4% were from 25 to 44; 25.1% were from 45 to 64; and 24.7% were 65 years of age or older. The gender makeup of the city was 48.8% male and 51.2% female.

2000 census
As of the census of 2000, there were 2,336 people, 979 households, and 550 families living in the city. The population density was 2,230.0 people per square mile (859.0/km2). There were 1,114 housing units at an average density of 1,063.4 per square mile (409.6/km2). The racial makeup of the city was 95.25% White, 0.34% African American, 2.87% Native American, 0.39% Asian, 0.09% from other races, and 1.07% from two or more races. Hispanic or Latino of any race were 0.98% of the population.

There were 979 households, out of which 24.4% had children under the age of 18 living with them, 47.6% were married couples living together, 6.4% had a female householder with no husband present, and 43.8% were non-families. 41.5% of all households were made up of individuals, and 24.2% had someone living alone who was 65 years of age or older. The average household size was 2.10 and the average family size was 2.86.

In the city, the population was spread out, with 19.0% under the age of 18, 14.2% from 18 to 24, 18.9% from 25 to 44, 20.8% from 45 to 64, and 27.2% who were 65 years of age or older. The median age was 43 years. For every 100 females, there were 87.6 males. For every 100 females age 18 and over, there were 85.0 males.

The median income for a household in the city was $29,022, and the median income for a family was $40,938. Males had a median income of $29,286 versus $20,089 for females. The per capita income for the city was $16,530. About 5.4% of families and 10.9% of the population were below the poverty line, including 16.0% of those under age 18 and 9.1% of those age 65 or over.

Education

K–12

Bottineau Public Schools, the local school district, operates one elementary school, one middle school, and one high school.

Higher education

 Dakota College at Bottineau

Media
Newspapers
The Bottineau Courant is a weekly publication.

Radio
KBTO Sunny 101.9 is a local FM station offering local weather, sports, advertisement and country music. A few other stations are available from nearby Manitoba such as 96.1 BOB FM which is an "80's 90's, and whatever" mix station from Brandon, MB, Canada.

Notable people

 Duane Klueh, retired basketball player and coach; former head coach for Indiana State men's basketball team
 Ryan Kraft, left wing hockey player with the German Kassel Huskies
 Gregory R. Page, president and CEO of Cargill Inc.
 Ronald Paulson, English professor, expert on William Hogarth works
 Neal Peterson, musician
 Tom Rapp, leader of the band Pearls Before Swine

Notes

External links

City of Bottineau official website
Bottineau Chamber of Commerce

Cities in Bottineau County, North Dakota
Cities in North Dakota
County seats in North Dakota
Populated places established in 1887
1887 establishments in Dakota Territory